Heh or HEH may refer to:

 Heh (god), an Egyptian deity
 Heh (letter), the fifth letter of many Semitic alphabets
 (H.E.H) His Exalted Highness, A salutation style used for the Nizams of Hyderabad State
 Hehe language, spoken in Tanzania
 Heho Airport, in  Shan State, Burma
 Helium hydride ion (HeH+)